Natural induction can refer to:
 Mathematical induction
 Natural induction (labor)